Osmanyurt (Josman-Yurt) is a rural locality (a selo) and the administrative centre of Osmanyurtovsky Selsoviet, Khasavyurtovsky District, Republic of Dagestan, Russia. The population was 2,598 as of 2010. There are 41 streets.

Geography 
Osmanyurt is located 9 km northwest of Khasavyurt (the district's administrative centre) by road. Simsir is the nearest rural locality.

References 

Rural localities in Khasavyurtovsky District